François Letexier (born 24 April 1989) is a French football referee who officiates in the Ligue 1. He has been a FIFA referee since 2017 and is ranked as a UEFA elite category referee.

Refereeing career
In 2016, Letexier began officiating in the Ligue 1. His first match as referee was on 23 January 2016 between Montpellier and Caen. In 2017, he was put on the FIFA referees list. He officiated his first senior international match on 23 March 2018 between Bulgaria and Bosnia and Herzegovina.

In April 2019, he referee final of UEFA Youth League Final 2021 between Porto and Chelsea. 

On 20 May 2021, he referee final of Coupe de France 2021 between Monaco and Paris Saint-Germain.

On 26 May 2021, as VAR, he officiated the final of the Europa League 2021 between Villarreal and Manchester United with central referee Clément Turpin. He referee three matches of 2021 UEFA European Under-21 Championship (including the quarterfinal between Portugal and Italy).

On 20 August 2022, Letexier referred Ligue 2 match between Saint-Étienne and Le Havre where he gives four red card to three Saint-Etienne's players; Anthony Briançon, Mathieu Cafaro and Etienne Green and a member of the Saint-Etienne staff. 

On 24 October 2022, Letexier was the subject of controversy during a Ligue 1 match between Nice and Nantes. At 19 minutes, he did not reward a penalty to Nantes when ball hits both of Mattia Viti's arms. Near the end of the match, he rewarded a controversial penalty to Nice when ball hits Jean-Charles Castelletto's arm. Letexier gave two red cards to Nantes' Kader Bamba, as well as their goalkeeper Alban Lafont (who received a second yellow card after the match ended). Days later, as he was receiving death threats on social media, Letexier defended his decisions during his interview with the newspaper L'Équipe.

References

External links
 Profile at WorldFootball.net
 Profile at EU-Football.info
 Profile at FFF.fr

1989 births
Living people
Sportspeople from Ille-et-Vilaine
French football referees